Barbara Kuit is a Dutch architect. In 1998, together with her partner Mark Hemel, Kuit founded Information Based Architecture (IBA).

IBA has won some of the most prestigious international competitions among which the competition for the world’s tallest TV tower, the Canton Tower, formerly known as the Guangzhou TV & Sightseeing Tower in Guangzhou, China (completed in 2010).

Biography 
Kuit was born in Rotterdam, the Netherlands. Before founding IBA, she worked for several years at the office of Zaha Hadid Architects. There she worked on various high-profile projects including the MAXXI – National Museum of the 21st Century Arts in Rome, Millennium Dome in London and Science Center in Wolfsburg. Before that she worked at Harper Mackay in London, as a local architect on various projects of Philippe Starck, St Martin’s Lane Hotel and Sanderson Hotel in London.

Career

Teaching
 From 1999–2007 Barbara Kuit was a visiting critic at the renowned Architectural Association in London.
 1990-1992 Taught various workshops at the Technical University Delft.
 2004-2005 Visiting critic at the Academie van Bouwkunst, Rotterdam
 2006-current Visiting lecturer at TU Delft
 2010-current  Post Graduate course coordinator University of Maastricht-Dep Architecture

Recognition
 Chosen as one of Design-Build network's new young architects to watch for 2010
 Conde Nast Traveler 2010: The New Wonders of the World
 Bizz magazine profile

Projects 
 2004–Present  Guangzhou TV & Sightseeing tower
 Principal Architect for the Guangzhou TV & Sightseeing tower of  GFA in Guangzhou
 project includes a conference center, retail, cinema, multiple restaurants and cafes, observation decks and administration offices
 2005–Present
 Principal Architect for  a multifunctional student housing complex in El Mina, Ghana, including internet café, guesthouse and student living quarters
 1997-2002 Zaha Hadid Architects
 2001  BMW event centre in Muenchen
 Design architect of  science museum
 2000-2002 Wolfsburg Science Centre, Germany
 Design architect of  science museum
 1998-1999 Contemporary Arts Centre in Rome
 Design architect of  museum. Program included exhibition spaces, retail, facilities and restaurants
 1998-1999 Mind zone in the Millennium Dome in London
 Design architect, content development and communication with Artists. Design regarded  exhibition pavilion
 1995-1997 Harper Mackay
 1996-1997  the Sanderson Hotel, London
 Philippe Starck in London the St Martins Lane Hotel
 architect of  refurbishment of listed heritage  building into 5 star hotel
 1996-1997  the St Martins Lane Hotel, London
 architect of  5 start hotel development in Central London.

Publications and Reference material 
IBA's work has been published and exhibited widely. In 2002 they were short listed for the Young Architects of the Year Award in the United Kingdom. They have received support by the Dutch Department of Trade and Industry and received several encouragement-grants by the Netherlands Foundation for Visual Arts, Design and Architecture.

Currently Kuit is working on a book titled Supermodel, the making of the world's tallest TV tower, which will come out in the early months of 2011.

References

External links
 Upcoming Doc-Eye documentary

Year of birth missing (living people)
Living people
Dutch women architects
Architects from Rotterdam
Delft University of Technology alumni
20th-century Dutch architects
21st-century Dutch architects
20th-century Dutch women